John Thomas O'Neil was an eminent Irish Anglican priest.

Educated at Trinity College, Dublin, he was the  Chancellor of Killaloe Cathedral before his appointment as  Dean of Kilmacduagh in 1837. He resigned the following year.

Notes

Alumni of Trinity College Dublin
Deans of Kilmacduagh
Year of birth missing
Year of death missing